New Zealand cinema can refer to films made by New Zealand-based production companies in New Zealand. However, it may also refer to films made about New Zealand by filmmakers from other countries. Due to the comparatively small size of its film industry, New Zealand produces many films that are co-financed by overseas companies.

The history of cinema in New Zealand is almost as long as the medium itself. The first public screening of a motion picture took place in 1896. A documentary made in 1900 is the oldest surviving New Zealand film, while the first feature film made in New Zealand premiered in 1914. A small-scale industry developed between the 1920s and the 1960s, but it was not until the 1970s that locally made films began to attract significant audiences.

From the 1990s onward, New Zealand-made films have increasingly achieved international success, including both those with local funding and themes, and those with additional foreign cooperation, such as Avatar and The Lord of the Rings trilogy.

Defining New Zealand film
In October 1978, the New Zealand Film Commission was formalised by Parliament under the Third National Government.

Under Section 17 of the New Zealand Film Commission Act 1978, the functions of the commission are to:
 Encourage and assist in the making, promotion, distribution and exhibition of films
 Encourage and promote cohesion with NZ film industry
 Encourage and promote maintenance of films in archives

With this Act, the New Zealand film industry became more stabilised. Section 18 of the Act, entitled "Content of Films", defines what makes "a New Zealand film". To qualify, a film must have "significant New Zealand content", judged by taking into account the following:
 The subject of the film (settings, characters, source material, etc.)
 The locations at which the film was made
 The nationalities or places of residence of:
 the authors, scriptwriters, composers, producers, directors, actors, technicians, editors, etc.
 the owners of any company, partnership, or joint venture involved in making the film
 the copyright holders
 The sources from which the money is derived
 The ownership and whereabouts of the equipment and technical facilities

These defining aspects have in recent years caused debate on whether films like The Frighteners and The Lord of the Rings qualify as New Zealand films. The impact of the New Zealand Film Commission upon the industry was significant in getting films made, coming to a definition of NZ Film, and helping establish a screen industry in New Zealand.

Most New Zealand films are made by independent filmmakers, often on a low budget and with sponsorship from public funding sources. Few New Zealand-made films have been specifically commissioned for the international market by international film distributors.

Recently, international film companies have become more aware of the skills of New Zealand filmmakers, and have increasingly used the country as a shooting location and also somewhere to finish production of their feature films.

Private funding for New Zealand films has often been in short supply, although for a period in the early 1980s, tax breaks resulted in a short term production boom. Some New Zealand directors and actors have been ignored in large part by their own country, despite success overseas, and often had to work in the US, Australia, and the UK as a result.

History

Early film: 1890s–1920s

The first public screening of a motion picture in New Zealand took place on 13 October 1896 at the Opera House in Auckland. The screening—which was in fact a demonstration of Thomas Edison's kinetograph—was part of a show presented by Charles Godfrey's Vaudeville Company. The first screening of a colour film—one using a colour process, not just a colourised black-and-white film—was on 24 December 1911 in Auckland. The film was shown simultaneously at the Globe Picture Theatre in Queen Street and the Kings Theatre on Upper Pitt Street (now the Mercury Theatre).

The first filmmaker in New Zealand was Alfred Henry Whitehouse, who made ten films between 1898 and mid-1900. The oldest surviving New Zealand film is Whitehouse's The Departure of the Second Contingent for the Boer War (1900).

The first feature film made in New Zealand is arguably Hinemoa. It premiered on 17 August 1914 at the Lyric Theatre, Auckland.

New Zealand's oldest surviving cinema is the Roxburgh, located in Central Otago. It was opened on 11 December 1897. The editors of the local newspaper, the Mt. Berenger Mail, wrote in the issue of 10 December: "We would draw the attention of the public to the Salon Cinématographe entertainment in the Athenæum Hall to-morrow evening. This is an opportunity which should not be missed of witnessing life scenes."

The classical era: 1920s–1960s
New Zealand's was a small-scale film industry between the 1920s and 1960s. In the 1920s and 1930s, Rudall Hayward made a number of feature films on New Zealand themes. Rewi's Last Stand was probably his best, but little of this 1925 film survives. The film was remade with sound in 1940. Independent filmmaker John O'Shea was active from 1940 to 1970 making New Zealand cinema; his company Pacific Films produced numerous short films as well as the three New Zealand feature films made in that period: Broken Barrier (1952) with Roger Mirams; Runaway (1964); and Don't Let It Get You (1966).

However, most New Zealand-made films of the period were documentaries. The National Film Unit was a government-funded producer of short films, documentaries, and publicity material. This is New Zealand, a short film made for the World Expo in 1970, was extremely popular there and subsequently screened in New Zealand cinemas, garnering considerable acclaim. It used three separate projectors to create a wide-screen image. The film was restored in 2006 and shown at the 2007 New Zealand International Film Festivals.

Establishment of the New Zealand Film Commission: 1970s–1980s
In 1978, the New Zealand Film Commission was established. Its aim was to encourage and promote the national film industry, and a number of film projects have been funded by the commission.

One of the first New Zealand films to attract large-scale audiences at home was Sleeping Dogs, directed by Roger Donaldson in 1977. The film, a dark, political action thriller that portrays the reaction of one man to the formation of a totalitarian government and the ensuing guerrilla war, introduced Sam Neill as a leading actor. The imagery of large-scale civil conflict and government repression would be realised only a few years later when the 1981 Springbok Tour caused nationwide protests and clashes with police.

Sleeping Dogs is also notable as the first full-length 35mm feature film made entirely by a New Zealand production crew. Before then, films such as 1973's Rangi's Catch had been shot in New Zealand, where they were set, but were produced and directed by foreign crews.

1981 saw the release of the road film Goodbye Pork Pie, which made NZ$1.5 million. Director Geoff Murphy was lured away by Hollywood, but he made two other key New Zealand films: Utu (1983), about the land wars of the 1860s, and a nuclear-apocalypse science-fiction story, The Quiet Earth (1985). Bruno Lawrence, who appeared in both films, became a star.

Melanie Read was the first woman to write and direct a New Zealand feature film with the 1984 thriller Trial Run. In 1987 Barry Barclay's film Ngati, screenplay by Tama Poata and starring veteran actor Wi Kuki Kaa, was released to critical acclaim and some box-office success. Ngati is recognised as the first feature film to be written and directed by a person of Māori descent.

Merata Mita was the first Māori woman to write and direct a dramatic feature film, when she directed Mauri in 1988. An accomplished documentary film-maker, Mita made landmark documentaries including Bastion Point: Day 507 (1980), about the occupation of land there, and Patu! (1983), a film about the controversial and violent anti-apartheid protests during the 1981 Springboks rugby tour from South Africa.

The late 1980s saw the reinvention of the New Zealand short film, beginning with Alison Maclean's Kitchen Sink. Instead of trying to be short features focused on dialogue and character, the new shorts tried instead to "push the envelope" in terms of visual design and cinematic grammar. An explosion of visually rich and compelling works emerged that seemed to have more in common with European art-house cinema than Hollywood.

Key examples of these are: The Lounge Bar (The Front Lawn), Kitchen Sink (Alison Maclean), A Little Death (Simon Perkins; Paul Swadel), Stroke (Christine Jeffs), La Vie en Rose (Anna Reeves), A Game With No Rules (Scott Reynolds), Eau de la vie (Simon Baré), O Tamaiti (The Children) (Sima Urale)—which won the Silver Lion Best Short Film at the Venice Film Festival—and Two Cars, One Night (Taika Waititi), which was nominated for the Best Short Film Oscar.

International breakthrough: 1990–2000

The early 1990s saw New Zealand film gain international recognition, most obviously with Jane Campion's The Piano (1993), which won three Academy Awards. Peter Jackson's Heavenly Creatures (1994) and Lee Tamahori's Once Were Warriors also received international acclaim and high grosses in a number of countries. The Piano and Heavenly Creatures showed an increasing tendency for New Zealand films to be partially or completely funded by overseas production companies, and star non-local actors (for example, Holly Hunter and Harvey Keitel in The Piano, and Kate Winslet in Heavenly Creatures). This did not stop the migration of New Zealanders to the United States: Tamahori, Melanie Lynskey of Heavenly Creatures and Canadian-born Piano star Anna Paquin are now all primarily based in America.

A notable exception to the migration tendency is Peter Jackson, who has continued to make films in New Zealand. Jackson's career began with low-budget comedies such as Bad Taste (1987) and Meet the Feebles (1989). He was eventually noticed by Hollywood, and in the 2000s directed The Lord of the Rings series. Although made with mainly foreign funding (helped by a tax break from the New Zealand government) and featuring a primarily international cast, Jackson filmed the films in New Zealand, using a largely local production crew, helping create an enormous skill base in the New Zealand film industry.

This has led to a number of prominent Hollywood films being made in New Zealand, with major international productions not only filming there but also using the country's various post-production facilities and special effects companies. Among these films are The Last Samurai and The Chronicles of Narnia: The Lion, the Witch and the Wardrobe. While the funding for these movies has come largely from the United States, the trend has helped New Zealand film studios and filmmakers develop skills and improve facilities.

However, some industry figures claim that having large international productions employ New Zealand crews has its downside. One New Zealand filmmaker recently complained that it has become difficult to employ cameramen on a low-budget New Zealand film, as cameramen are now used to large wages. Other filmmakers find that the opposite is true, and argue that the greater number of local professionals may have driven wages down from the relative heights of the 1980s. Another alleged downside is that big-budget international productions swallow up any funding New Zealand has available, making it far more difficult for local productions to get made.

2001–present

In early 21st century, the amount of local content has significantly increased, with Whale Rider (2002) becoming the second-highest-grossing North American independent film of 2003 and third-highest worldwide, earning $40.1 million. Other notable films include In My Father's Den (2004) and The World's Fastest Indian (2005). Both films did well at the New Zealand box office, with the latter beating Once Were Warriors to become the highest-grossing New Zealand film at the domestic box office, earning over 6.5 million; a record beaten by Boy in 2010.

Sam Neill and Judy Rymer's documentary Cinema of Unease was made in 1995. It is seen as an accessible and important history of New Zealand cinema.

The latter part of the first decade of the new century saw the expansion of Peter Jackson's filmmaking empire, with the producer-director optioning the rights to The Lovely Bones, Halo, The Dam Busters and the fantasy series Temeraire. Major productions such as Avatar and the 2007 blockbuster The Water Horse used Jackson's Wellington studios and the services of the special-effects company Weta Digital.

Eagle vs Shark (2007) was director Taika Waititi's first feature film, starring Jemaine Clement and Loren Horsley. Waititi's film Boy, released in 2010, topped the box office receipts for the opening week, earning more on its opening day than any previous locally made film, becoming the highest-grossing New Zealand film of all time. In 2014 the mockumentary What We Do in the Shadows, directed by Waititi and Clement, was released to substantial critical acclaim. Two years later, Waititi released Hunt for the Wilderpeople, starring Sam Neill and Julian Dennison, a film that became the new highest-grossing opening weekend box office New Zealand film on home soil, beating the record set by Boy six years prior.

New Zealand Film Archive

The New Zealand Film Archive was founded and incorporated on 9 March 1981. Film enthusiast, critic and historian Jonathan Dennis (19532002) was a driving force behind the archive, and became its first director. The archive was set up to preserve and restore significant New Zealand film and television images. It now holds a collection of much of early New Zealand cinema film and holds public screenings of its collection.

Much of the early cinema film made in New Zealand has been lost, as it was printed on nitrate, which is unstable. In 1992, when film enthusiasts and the New Zealand Film Archive realised how much of New Zealand's film heritage was being lost, they mounted the Last Film Search and found 7,000 significant films, both in New Zealand and around the world.

Highest-grossing films shot in New Zealand

Personalities

Other notable feature directors

Other notable actors

See also

 Antipodean Film Festival
 List of cinema of the world
 List of New Zealand film makers
 List of New Zealand films
 List of films set in New Zealand

 Wellywood
 World cinema

References

External links
 New Zealand Film Commission
 New Zealand Film Archive
 NZ On Screen
 New Zealand Feature Films on DVD